Green Grove may refer to:

Places
 Green Grove, Ceredigion, a village in the community of Llanfihangel Ystrad, Ceredigion, Wales
 Green Grove, New Jersey, an unincorporated community in Monmouth County, New Jersey, United States
 Green Grove, Wisconsin, a town in Clark County, Wisconsin, United States

Fictional entities
 Green Grove Retirement Community, the fictional retirement community where Tony Soprano, Paulie Gualtieri, and other Mafiosi admit their mothers, in The Sopranos